The 2017 Ronde van Drenthe was the 55th edition of the Ronde van Drenthe road cycling one day race. It was held on 11 March 2017 as part of the UCI Europe Tour in category 1.1.

Teams
Twenty-one teams of up to eight riders started the race:

Result

References 

Ronde van Drenthe
Ronde van Drenthe
Ronde van Drenthe